Frigyes Riedl (September 12, 1856 in Ladomér – August 7, 1921 in Budapest) was a prominent Hungarian essayist, critic and literature historian. His most famous work is the monography of János Arany, one of the most important 19th century Hungarian poets.

Hungarian scientists
1856 births
1921 deaths